The Irish Independent Sport  Star Awards are a recognition of the best achievements in sport from Irish individuals and teams within Ireland and internationally. The awards is an annual event that takes place in December and is a star-studded event with leading Irish sports managers, athletes and officials in attendance. Awards go to: Sport Star of the Year, Young Sport Star of the Year, and a special Hall of Fame recipient.

The awards began in 1989 with Tipperary's Nicky English the very first Sport Star of the Year. The Irish Independent Sport Star Hall of Fame award began in 1995 with Christy O'Connor Sr; and in 2004, Cathy Gannon was the first Young Sport Star of the Year. In over a quarter of a century, previous award winners have included Rory McIlroy, Katie Taylor, Sonia O'Sullivan, Packie Bonner, Michael Carruth, Padraig Harrington, Roy Keane and Aidan O'Brien.

The most recent winners in 2015 were Leona Maguire for Young Sport Star, Kevin Moran in the Hall of Fame, and Paul O'Connell for Sport Star of the Year.

Sports Star of the Year Winners 

By Year

Hall of Fame Winners 

By Year

Padraig Power Young Sports Star of the Year Winners 

By Year

References

Awards established in 1989
Irish sports trophies and awards
1989 establishments in Ireland